Tawnaghgorm may refer to:
Tawnaghgorm, County Donegal, a townland in County Donegal, Ireland
Tawnaghgorm, County Fermanagh, a townland in County Fermanagh, Northern Ireland